Mimommata is a genus of beetles in the family Cerambycidae, containing the following species:

 Mimommata mollardi Penaherrera-Leiva & Tavakilian, 2003
 Mimommata pernauti Tavakilian & Penaherrera-Leiva, 2003

References

Rhinotragini